KYUL (1310 AM) is a radio station  broadcasting a News Talk Information format. Licensed to Scott City, Kansas, United States, the station is currently owned by Steckline Communications and features programming from ESPN Radio, Fox News Radio and Westwood One. It simulcasts most of the programming of sister station KIUL, Garden City.

Prior to Steckline's acquisition, KYUL's call letters were KFLA. Before it and KIUL were spun off from Western Kansas Broadcasting, KFLA was a sister station to Cool 94, an FM station licensed to Scott City.

References

External links

YUL